Valluri Balakrishna was an Indian actor who primarily appeared in Telugu films as a comedian. He acted in more than 100 films as a comedian, but the role he played in the movie Patala Bhairavi alongside N. T. Rama Rao as "Anji Gadu" made him popular with the audience. He also played a role Sarathi in the very popular film Mayabazar.

Another Telugu comedian Rajababu used to felicitate one veteran on his birthday every year. He started this tradition with Valluri Balakrishna because he was very much inspired by his acting in the film Patala Bhairavi. He watched that film around 90 times.

Filmography
 1951 Patala Bhairavi
1952 Pelli Chesi Choodu
 1955 Missamma
1955 Jayasimha
1956 Chiranjeevulu
1956 Sri Gauri Mahatyam
1957 Bhagya Rekha
1957 Mayabazar
1957 Dongallo Dora
1957 Bhale Ammayilu
1957 Panduranga Mahatyam
1957 Suvarna Sundari
1957 Vaddante Pelli as Sony
1957 Kutumba Gowravam
1958 Aada Pettanam
1958 Dongalunnaru Jagratha
1959 Appu Chesi Pappu Koodu
1959 Banda Ramudu
1959 Rechukka Pagatichukka
1960 Pillalu Techina Challani Rajyam
1962 Gulebakavali Katha
1962 Dakshayagnam 
1962 Khaidi Kannaiah
1962 Gundamma Katha
1962 Madana Kamaraju Katha
1963 Savati Koduku
1963 Irugu Porugu
 1963 Guruvunu Minchina Sishyudu
1963 Pempudu Koothuru
1963 Bandipotu
1963 Nartanasala
1963 Somavara Vratha Mahatyam 
 1964 Aggi Pidugu
1964 Marmayogi
 1965 Mangamma Sapatham
1965 Prameelarjuneeyam
1965 Pratigna Palana
1965 Vijaya Simha
1966 Aggi Barata
1967 Chikkadu Dorakadu
1967 Vasantha Sena
1967 Sri Sri Sri Maryada Ramanna
1967 Ummadi Kutumbam
 1968 Tikka Sankarayya
 1968 Uma Chandi Gowri Shankarula Katha
1968 Pedarasi Peddamma Katha
1969 Saptaswaralu
1969 Kadaladu Vadaladu as Gajapathi
1969 Raja Simha
1971 Ananda Nilayam
1971 Rajakota Rahasyam
1971 Pavitra Bandham
1971 Andam Kosam Pandem as Kilakilasri
1972 Datta Putrudu
1972 Sri Krishna Satya
1972 Pandanti Kapuram
1973 Manchi Vallaki Manchivadu
1974 Nippulanti Manishi
1974 Tulabharam as Barber Kanaka Rao
1975 Pooja
1976 Maa Daivam
1976 Muthyala Pallaki
1977 Edureeta
1978 Lawyer Viswanath
1978 Dudu Basavanna as Photographer
1980 Punnami Naagu
1980 Kodalu Vastunaru Jagratha
1981 Taxi Driver as Appalakonda
1982 Manishiko Charithra

References

Telugu male actors
Male actors in Telugu cinema
Indian male film actors
Year of birth missing (living people)
Place of birth missing (living people)
Living people
20th-century Indian male actors